Bleeding Star is the final studio album by New Zealand band Jean-Paul Sartre Experience. It was released in 1993 via Matador Records and is credited to JPS Experience.

The album peaked at #6 on the New Zealand albums chart.

Critical reception
Trouser Press called Bleeding Star "an immaculate big-budget production [that] ... unveils a new commercial face for the band." The Washington Post wrote that the album "is unfailingly pretty, but the lovestruck ethereality of songs like 'Breathe' is a little too wistful for its own good." Miami New Times praised "Into You," writing that it "kicks in with the powerful, hypnotic, ambient guitar sounds the band's known for, with great pop melodies skipping across the top."

Track listing
"Intro" - 0:28
"Into You" - 3:49
"Ray of Shine" - 3:16
"I Believe in You" - 3:16
"Spaceman" - 2:46
"Still Can't Be Seen" - 2:56
"Bleeding Star" - 5:07
"Breathe" - 3:13
"Modus Vivendi" - 3:03
"Block" - 5:48
"Angel" - 5:30

References 

1993 albums
Jean-Paul Sartre Experience albums
Flying Nun Records albums